The St. Marks Formation is a Miocene geologic formation in the eastern Florida Panhandle.

Age
Period: Neogene
Epoch: Miocene ~23.03 to 5.33 mya, calculates to a period of 
Faunal stage: Arikareean through Hemphillian

Location
The St. Marks Formation is exposed in Wakulla, southern Leon and southern Jefferson County, Florida on the northwestern flank of the Ocala Platform and along with Suwannee Limestone and Ocala Limestone makes up the upper part of the Floridan Aquifer in the eastern panhandle.

Composition
The St. Marks Formation consists of a white to yellowish gray, poorly to moderately hard, sandy, fossil bearing rock in molds and casts within packstone to wackestone.

Fossils
The fossils are in molds and casts and include: 
Mollusks

References

Florida Carbonate "Formations" and Conflicting Interpretations of Injection Well Regulations
Finch, J., Geological essay on the Tertiary formation in America: American Journal of Science, v. 7, p. 31-43, 1823.

Neogene Florida
Miocene United States
Miocene Series of North America
Geologic formations of Florida
Paleontology in Florida